Pudhu Manithan is a 1991 Indian Tamil-language film, directed by Manivannan. The film stars Sathyaraj and Bhanupriya, with Sarathkumar as the antagonist. The film's music was by Deva and was released on 22 March 1991 was a box office hit.

Plot 

Kabali, an orphan, lives in a slum with an old Brahmin woman named Pangajam, and he considers her like his mother. Kabali is a fisherman and also the slum's rowdy, but he has a heart of gold. He went to jail many times only because he fought against injustice.

Suganthi, a chorus singer who is also an orphan, often returns home late. For her safety, she uses Kabali's name to avoid the rowdies and lies that she is his girlfriend. One day, Kabali meets her and slaps her for misusing his name. Thereafter, he falls in love with her.

Sundar is a rich man and womanizer. He is able to have any girls he wants by money or force. His mother sympathizes with Suganthi and decides to get her married to Sundar.

When Kabali decides to propose his love to Suganthi, she first tells him that she has accepted Sundar's marriage proposal, and she invites him to the wedding. Kabali is then heartbroken as he knows about Sundar's bad habits, but he decides to hide the truth because he does not want to hurt her feelings.

At the wedding day, however, Sundar stops the marriage because he thinks that Suganthi has an illicit affair with Kabali. Kabali tells him that he is wrong and challenges him to arrange their marriage another day. What transpires later forms the crux of the story.

Cast 

Sathyaraj as Kabali
Bhanupriya as Suganthi
Sarathkumar as Sundar
Manorama as Pangajam
Goundamani as Rasappa
Sathyapriya as Sundar's mother
Madhuri as Lakshmi
Thalapathi Dinesh as Henchman
Ponnambalam as Henchman
Manivannan
Vasu
Ennatha Kannaiya
Poornam Viswanathan in a cameo appearance
L. R. Eswari in a cameo appearance
Shankar–Ganesh in a cameo appearance

Soundtrack 
The soundtrack was composed by Deva.

References

External links 
 

1990s Tamil-language films
1991 films
Films directed by Manivannan
Films scored by Deva (composer)
Films scored by Shankar–Ganesh